Holland Dai'mon Witherspoon, also known as Mr. Envi', is an American rapper based out of Bossier City, Louisiana. He is the owner of Southern Stisles Records and Hood Critic Magazine and is now the founder of the North Louisiana Football Alliance, a minor developmental football league where he currently serves as the league president.

Career 
In 2001, Mr. Envi' started releasing mixtapes locally catching the attention of a local radio personality at 107.5FM in Uniontown, Alabama, where he's originally from. This soon led him to his first single "Break His Jaw", to be aired on local radio. Shortly after, he moved to Louisiana where he felt he'd have a better opportunity to break out nationally.

Mr. Envi' released his first album "Rydaz Redemption" in 2011. The album debuted at #3 on the CMJ National Hip Hop Add Charts. Rydaz Redemption was later followed by two EP's, "Kollaborationz" in 2012 and "Point of No Return" in 2013. He went on to sign a non-exclusive distribution deal with Oklahoma-based Tate Music Group, releasing one album entitled "The Recap" in 2014.

In 2015, he partnered with the New Jersey-based marketing company Mia Mind Music to release "Damage Kontrol". The album was distributed by Select-O-Hits and featured guest appearances from Young Bleed, La Chat and more. "Damage Kontrol" was released on August 14, 2015, with a promotional tour to follow the release. Later that year, Mr. Envi' received word that he had been nominated in three categories for the 2016 SCM Awards, held in Memphis, Tennessee.

While touring consistently between 2015 and 2016, Mr. Envi' began recording for his upcoming EP series. The series consisted of two parts; "Evryday Hustle" being the first, was released May 27, 2016, and "All Nite Grind" the second. Originally intended to be released around mid September 2016, "All Nite Grind" was rescheduled for an early 2017 release.

Over the years, Mr. Envi' has either shared a stage or worked with many notable artist such as Juvenile, Young Bleed, La Chat, Shawnna, Chalie Boy and Crooked I, among others.

Southern Stisles Records 

Southern Stisles Records is a Louisiana-based independent record label specializing in hip-hop. It was founded by Holland (Mr. Envi') Witherspoon in 2001.

Current artists 
Mr. Envi' (founder/CEO)
Delicate Marie
Bigg Redd
DJ Certified 318 (Tour DJ)

Discography

Independent albums 
Rydaz Redemption – 2011
Kollaborationz – 2012
Damage Kontrol – 2015

EPs 
Point of No Return – 2013
Evryday Hustle – 2016
All Nite Grind – 2017
Tha 40oz – 2018

Compilations 
The Recap – 2014
The Recap II – 2017

Mixtapes 
Tantrum – 2004
From Tha Top To Bottom Vol. 1 – 2009
From Tha Top To Bottom Vol. 2 – 2010
From Tha Top To Bottom Vol. 3 – 2011
Affiliationz Vol. 1 – 2011
From Tha Top To Bottom Vol. 4 – 2012

References

External links 
Southern Stisles Records official website

Rappers from Alabama
Living people
People from Uniontown, Alabama
Underground rappers
21st-century American rappers
Year of birth missing (living people)